Isotoma luticola is a small herbaceous plant in the family Campanulaceae native to Western Australia.

The prostrate annual herb produces blue-violet flowers.

It is found along the banks of pools, creeks and rivers in the Kimberley region of Western Australia.

References

luticola
Flora of Western Australia
Plants described in 1980